Sam Durham (born 19 July 2001) is an Australian rules footballer who plays for Essendon in the Australian Football League (AFL). He was recruited by Essendon with the 9th draft pick in the 2021 mid season draft. He made his debut in round 18 of the 2021 season against North Melbourne.  He collected 11 disposals in an 18-point victory.

Durham was upgraded to Essendon's senior list for the 2023 season after a season and a half on the rookie list.

References

External links

Living people
2001 births
Australian rules footballers from Victoria (Australia)
Essendon Football Club players